Rabia or Rabiah is the transliteration of two Arabic names written differently in Arabic text however they may be written similarly in the Latin script: 

 An Arabic, usually male name meaning "Spring"
 An Arabic, female name meaning "Spring" or "Fourth Female"

People

Male name Rabīʿah
 Rabiah ibn Kab, a companion of the Islamic prophet Muhammad
 Ayyash ibn Abi Rabiah (died 636), companion of Muhammad
 Utbah ibn Rabi'ah (died 624), pre-Islamic Arab tribal leader
 Rabiah ibn Mudhar, 6th-century Jewish king in present-day Yemen
 Abd ar-Rahman ibn Rabiah, 7th-century caliphate general
 Salman ibn Rabiah (died 650), military governor of Armenia
 Fouad Mahmoud al Rabiah (born 1959), Kuwaiti national formerly imprisoned at Guantanamo Bay
 Robert Rabiah (born 1986), Australian film actor and writer
 Tawfiq Al Rabiah, Saudi minister
 Abu Hamza Rabia (died 2005), Egyptian member of al-Qaeda
 Hamad Abu Rabia (1929–1981), Israeli-Arab politician
 Hassan Rabia (born 1984), Omani footballer
 Mohammed Rabia Al-Noobi (born 1981), Omani footballer
 Ramy Rabia (born 1993), Egyptian footballer
 Sarab Abu-Rabia-Queder (born 1976), Israeli-Arab sociologist, anthropologist, and feminist activist
 Rabia Makhloufi (born 1986), Algerian steeplechase runner

Female name Rābiʿah 
 Rabia of Basra (710s–801), 8th-century female Muslim Sufi saint
 Rabia Balkhi, semi-legendary figure of Persian literature
 Rabia Bala Hatun, consort of Ottoman Sultan Osman I
 Emetullah Rabia Gülnuş Sultan (1642–1715), Haseki of Ottoman Sultan Mehmed IV, mother and Valide Sultan of Sultan Mustafa II and Ahmed III.  
 Rabia Sultan (died 1712), Haseki of Ottoman Sultan Ahmed II
 Rabia Şermi Kadin (died 1732), consort of Sultan Ahmed III and mother of Sultan Abdülhamid I. 
 Cheikha Rabia, Algerian singer
 Rabia Ashiq (born 1992), Pakistani athlete
 Rabia Butt, Pakistani model and actress
 Rabia Cirit (born 1998), Turkish female para-athlete
Rabia Kayahan (born 2000), Turkish female armwrestler
 Rabia Kazan (born 1976), Turkish journalist
 Rabia Qari, Pakistani barrister
 Rabiah Hutchinson (born 1953), Australian militant Islamist leader

Places
 Al-Rabiaa, a village in northwestern Syria
 Diyar Rabi'a, the medieval Arabic name of the easternmost province of the Jazira (Upper Mesopotamia)
 Oum Rabia, a commune in Khénifra Province, Béni Mellal-Khénifra, Morocco
 Rabia, Iraq, a small border crossing town between Iraq and Syria
 Rabia, Syria, a town in the Latakia Governorate, northwestern Syria

Other uses
 Rabīʿa, an Arab tribe
 Rabia School, Luton, Bedfordshire, England.
 Rabaa Al-Adawiya Mosque, a mosque in Cairo, Egypt
 Rabia sign, a hand gesture

See also
 Rabeya (disambiguation)
 Rabiah (disambiguation)
 

Arabic feminine given names
Arabic masculine given names
Arabic given names